Po tebe is the fifth studio album by the Macedonian singer Toše Proeski. The album was released in Macedonia and subsequently in Serbia, Montenegro, Bosnia and Herzegovina, Croatia and Slovenia under the Serbian title Pratim te.

Reception
Po tebe was a huge success for Toše Proeski. 170.000 copies of the album have been distributed and spread over countries such as  Macedonia, Bosnia & Herzegovina, Serbia & Montenegro and Bulgaria where the songs Koj li ti grize obrazi and Lagala nas mala became huge hits. From the album Toše has video released the hits: "Po tebe", "Koj li ti grize obrazi", "Lagala nas mala", Krajnje vrijeme" and "Za ovoj svet".

Track listings
"Po tebe (After you)"
music: Miro Buljanarrangement: Miro Buljanlyrics: Antonija ŠolaTranslation: Vlado Janevski
"Žao mi je (I am sorry)"
music: Leontina Vukomanovićarrangement: Leontina Vukomanovićlyrics: Leontina Vukomanović
"Rani na usnite (Wounds on the lips)"
music: Miro Buljanarrangement: Miro Buljanlyrics: Antonija ŠolaTranslation: Vlado Janevski
"Slušaš li (Can you hear)"
music: Toše Proeskiarrangement: Toše Proeskilyrics: Vlado Janevski
"Malečka (Little one)"
music: Toše Proeskiarrangement: Bora Čorbalyrics: Toše Proeski
"Gromovi na duša (Thunders on soul)"
music: Miro Buljanarrangement: Miro Buljanlyrics: Antonija Sola
"Lošo ti stoi (It looks bad on you)"
music: Aleksandra Milutinovićarrangement: Aleksandra Milutinovićlyrics: Vlado Janevski 
"Koj li ti grize obrazi (Who's biting your cheeks)"
music: Miro Buljanarrangement: Miro Buljanlyrics: Antonija ŠolaTranslation: Vlado Janevski
"Polsko cveḱe (Meadow flower)"
music: Toše Proeskiarrangement: Toše Proeskilyrics: Toše Proeski
"Naj, naj (Most, most)"
music: Zoran Gjorgjevicarrangement: Zoran Đorđevićlyrics: Vlado Janevski
"Za ovoj svet (This world)"
music: Mladen Markovićarrangement:Mladen Markovićlyrics: Vesna Malinova

Single tracks
"Lagala nas mala ft. Toni Cetinski (The little one lied to us)"
music: Miro Buljanarrangement: Miro Buljanlyrics: Nenad Ninčević
"This world"
music: Mladen Markovićarrangement: Mladen Markovićlyrics: A. Klinar
"Krajnje vrijeme ft. Anja Rupel (The time has come)"
music: A. Klinararrangement: A. Klinarlyrics: /

Release history

References

2005 albums
Toše Proeski albums